Donna Barton Brothers (born April 20, 1966 in Alamogordo, New Mexico) is a former jockey who won over 1,100 horse races and now covers horse racing and other equestrian sports for NBC Sports and USA Network. She is probably most recognizable for her interviews with the winning jockeys from horseback after the Triple Crown and Breeders' Cup races. She is one of the most decorated female jockeys of her time, retiring in 1998 with 1,130 career wins and still ranks second on the money list. Brothers hails from a family of riders, including both of her siblings, as well as her mother who was, in 1969, one of the first women to be licensed as a jockey.  She resides in Louisville, Kentucky.

Career
Donna Barton's mother Patti Barton was a jockey. So were her brother and sister. Although her mother never insisted she follow the same career path, at age 21, Barton listened to an agent who said she should try being a jockey.  Brothers began her professional career as a jockey in 1987. She was one of D. Wayne Lukas' first call jockeys in the 1990s and rode numerous stakes winners, at the time making her the second leading money-earner of all time among female Thoroughbred jockeys.
 
She won 1,130 races in her career. In terms of earnings, Barton still ranks fourth among female jockeys even though she retired in 1998.

Barton retired in 1998, married trainer Frank Brothers, and then became involved in television broadcasting. Brothers started as an interviewer at the Fair Grounds Race Course in New Orleans then as an on-air racing analyst for Churchill Downs where she joined their other analyst, Mike Battaglia. She was "discovered" by NBC Sports in 2000 when NBC was at Churchill Downs for observation in advance of assuming Derby coverage from ABC in 2001.  She began working for NBC that fall doing their Breeders' Cup coverage as their only reporter on horseback. She attended University of Louisville from 2002 to 2005 but became too busy with reporting duties for NBC Sports and other networks and moved to full-time work as a reporter and racing analyst in 2005.

Brothers served as a racing analyst for Churchill Downs' "Paddock Preview" show from April 1999 to November 2002. Additionally, Brothers did on-location work for TVG, a horseracing network, providing on-site reports from both Churchill Downs and the Fair Grounds from November 1999 to November 2002. She also covered Keeneland's Spring and Fall meets for TVG from 2009 to 2016.

At Triple Crown races, Brothers positions herself near the starting gate for the start of the race then, for the Kentucky Derby, she rides around the track backward (along the outside rail), passing the horses who are racing, thus getting in position to be the first to interview the winning jockey. For the Preakness and Belmont Stakes she is also positioned behind the starting gate for the start but then follows the field into the first turn and waits for the winner on the backstretch.

Brothers has also covered the PBR Professional Bull Riders and the Hambletonian Stakes, for NBC. She currently covers (for NBC Sports) the World Equestrian Games, the Land Rover Kentucky Three Day show, and the NBC/NBCSN "Road to the Kentucky Derby" and "Road to the Breeders' Cup" shows.

In 2011, she released the book, "Inside Track: Inside Guide to Horse Racing". The book was revised and released in its second edition in 2014.

References

External links
 
Official Website

1966 births
Living people
American female jockeys
American horse racing announcers
American horse racing commentators
Women sports announcers
American women sportswriters
People from Alamogordo, New Mexico
Horse trainers from Louisville, Kentucky
Jockeys from Louisville, Kentucky
21st-century American women